Johann Ludwig von Windsheim, O.S.A. (died 1480) was a Roman Catholic prelate who served as Auxiliary Bishop of Regensburg (1468–1480) and Titular Bishop of Hierapolis in Phrygia. (1468–1480)

Biography
Ulrich Aumayer was ordained a priest in the Order of Saint Augustine. On 3 Aug 1468, he was appointed during the papacy of Pope Paul II as Auxiliary Bishop of Regensburg and Titular Bishop of Hierapolis in Phrygia. He served as Auxiliary Bishop of Regensburg until his death on 19 Nov 1480.

See also 
Catholic Church in Germany

References 

15th-century Roman Catholic bishops in Bavaria
Bishops appointed by Pope Paul II
1480 deaths
Augustinian bishops